Solar desalination is a desalination technique powered by solar energy. The two common methods are direct (thermal) and indirect (photovoltaic).

History

Solar distillation has been used for thousands of years. Early Greek mariners and Persian alchemists produced both freshwater and medicinal distillates. Solar stills were the first method used on a large scale to convert contaminated water into a potable form.

In 1870 the first US patent was granted for a solar distillation device to Norman Wheeler and Walton Evans. Two years later in Las Salinas, Chile, Swedish engineer Charles Wilson began building a solar distillation plant to supply freshwater to workers at a saltpeter and silver mine. It operated continuously for 40 years and distilled an average of 22.7 m3 of water a day using the effluent from mining operations as its feed water.

Solar desalination in the United States began in the early 1950s when Congress passed the Conversion of Saline Water Act, which led to the establishment of the Office of Saline Water (OSW) in 1955. OSW's main function was to administer funds for desalination research and development projects. One of five demonstration plants was located in Daytona Beach, Florida. Many of the projects were aimed at solving water scarcity issues in remote desert and coastal communities. In the 1960s and 1970s several distillation plants were constructed on the Greek isles with capacities ranging from 2000 to 8500 m3/day. In 1984 a plant was constructed in Abu-Dhabi with a capacity of 120 m3/day that is still in operation. In Italy, an open source design called "the Eliodomestico" by Gabriele Diamanti was developed for personal costing $50.

Of the estimated 22 million m3 daily freshwater produced through desalination worldwide, less than 1% uses solar energy. The prevailing methods of desalination, MSF and RO, are energy-intensive and rely heavily on fossil fuels. Because of inexpensive methods of freshwater delivery and abundant low-cost energy resources, solar distillation has been viewed as cost-prohibitive and impractical. It is estimated that desalination plants powered by conventional fuels consume the equivalent of 203 million tons of fuel a year.

Methods

In the direct (distillation) method, a solar collector is coupled with a distilling mechanism. Solar stills of this type are described in survival guides, provided in marine survival kits, and employed in many small desalination and distillation plants.

Indirect desalination employs a solar collection array, consisting of photovoltaic and/or fluid-based thermal collectors, and a separate conventional desalination plant. Many arrangements have been analyzed, experimentally tested and deployed. Categories include multiple-effect humidification (MEH), multi-stage flash distillation (MSF), multiple-effect distillation (MED), multiple-effect boiling (MEB), humidification–dehumidification (HDH), reverse osmosis (RO), and freeze-effect distillation.

Indirect solar desalination systems using photovoltaic (PV) panels and reverse osmosis (RO) have been in use since 2009. Utirik Atoll in the Pacific Ocean has been supplied with fresh water this way since 2010.

Indirect solar desalination by a form of humidification/dehumidification is in use in the seawater greenhouse.

Indirect 

Large solar desalination plants typically use indirect methods. Indirect solar desalination processes are categorized into single-phase processes (membrane based) and phase change processes (non-membrane based). Single-phase desalination use photovoltaics to produce electricity that drive pumps. Phase-change (or multi-phase) solar desalination is not membrane-based.

Single-phase desalination processes include reverse osmosis and membrane distillation, where membranes filter water from contaminants. As of 2014 reverse osmosis (RO) made up about 52% of indirect methods. Pumps push salt water through RO modules at high pressure. RO systems depend on pressure differences. A pressure of 55–65 bar is required to purify seawater. An average of 5 kWh/m3 of energy is typically required to run a large-scale RO plant. Membrane distillation (MD) utilizes pressure difference from two sides of a microporous hydrophobic membrane. Fresh water can be extracted through four MD methods: Direct Contact (DCMD), Air Gap (AGMD), Sweeping Gas (SGMD) and Vacuum (VMD). An estimated water cost of $15/m3 and $18/m3 support medium-scale solar-MD plants. Energy consumption ranges from 200 to 300 kWh/m3.

Phase-change (or multi-phase) solar desalination includes multi-stage flash, multi-effect distillation (MED), and thermal vapor compression (VC). It is accomplished by using phase change materials (PCMs) to maximize latent heat storage and high temperatures. MSF phase change temperatures range 80–120 °C, 40–100 °C for VC, and 50–90 °C for the MED method. Multi-stage flash (MSF) requires seawater to travel through a series of vacuumed reactors held at successively lower pressures. Heat is added to capture the latent heat of the vapor. As seawater flows through the reactors, steam is collected and is condensed to produce fresh water. In Multi-effect distillation (MED), seawater flows through successively low pressure vessels and reuses latent heat to evaporate seawater for condensation. MED desalination requires less energy than MSF due to higher efficiency in thermodynamic transfer rates.

Direct 
Direct methods use thermal energy to vaporize the seawater as part of a 2-phase separation. Such methods are relatively simple and require little space so they are normally used on small systems. However, they have a low production rate due to low operating temperature and pressure, so they are appropriate for systems that yield 200 m3/day.

Single-effect 
This uses the same process as rainfall. A transparent cover encloses a pan where saline water is placed. The latter traps solar energy, evaporating the seawater. The vapor condenses on the inner face of a sloping transparent cover, leaving behind salts, inorganic and organic components and microbes.

The direct method achieves values of 4-5 L/m2/day and efficiency of 30-40%. Efficiency can be improved to 45% by using a double slope or an additional condenser.

In a wick still, feed water flows slowly through a porous radiation-absorbing pad. This requires less water to be heated and is easier to change the angle towards the sun which saves time and achieves higher temperatures.

A diffusion still is composed of a hot storage tank coupled to a solar collector and the distillation unit. Heating is produced by the thermal diffusion between them.

Increasing the internal temperature using an external energy source can improve productivity.

Indirect multi-phase

Multi-stage flash distillation (MSF)

Multi-stage flash distillation is in widespread use. As of 2009, it accounted for roughly 45% of the world desalination capacity and 93% of thermal systems.

In Margherita di Savoia, Italy a 50–60 m3/day MSF plant uses a salinity gradient solar pond. In El Paso, Texas a similar project produces 19 m3/day. In Kuwait a MSF facility uses parabolic trough collectors to provide solar thermal energy to produce 100 m3 of fresh water a day. And in Northern China an experimental, automatic, unmanned operation uses 80 m2 of vacuum tube solar collectors coupled with a 1 kW wind turbine (to drive several small pumps) to produce 0.8 m3/day.

MSF solar distillation has an output capacity of 6–60 L/m2/day versus the 3-4 L/m2/day standard output of a solar still. MSF experience poor efficiency during start-up or low energy periods. Achieving highest efficiency requires controlled pressure drops across each stage and steady energy input. As a result, solar applications require some form of thermal energy storage to deal with cloud interference, varying solar patterns, nocturnal operation, and seasonal temperature changes. As thermal energy storage capacity increases a more continuous process can be achieved and production rates approach maximum efficiency.

Freezing 
Although it has only been used on demonstration projects, this indirect method based on crystallization of the saline water has the advantage of the low energy required. Since the latent heat of fusion of water is 6,01 kJ/mole and the latent heat of vaporization at 100 °C is 40,66 kJ/mole, it should be cheaper in terms of energy cost. Furthermore, the corrosion risk is lower too. There is however a disadvantage related with the difficulties of mechanically moving mixtures of ice and liquid. The process has not been commercialized yet due to cost and difficulties with refrigeration systems.

The most studied way of using this process is the refrigeration freezing. A refrigeration cycle is used to cool the water stream to form ice, and after that those crystals are separated and melted to obtain fresh water. There are some recent examples of this solar powered processes: the unit constructed in Saudi Arabia by Chicago Bridge and Iron Inc. in the late 1980s, which was shut down for its inefficiency.

Nevertheless, there is a recent study for the saline groundwater  concluding that a plant capable of producing 1 million gal/day would produce water at a cost of $1.30/1000 gallons. Being this true, it would be a cost-competitive device with the reverse osmosis ones.

Problems with thermal systems 
Inherent design problems face thermal solar desalination projects. First, the system's efficiency is governed by competing heat and mass transfer rates during evaporation and condensation.

Second, the heat of condensation is valuable because it takes large amounts of solar energy to evaporate water and generate saturated, vapor-laden hot air. This energy is, by definition, transferred to the condenser's surface during condensation. With most solar stills, this heat is emitted as waste heat.

Solutions 
Heat recovery allows the same heat input to be reused, providing several times the water.

One solution is to reduce the pressure within the reservoir. This can be accomplished using a vacuum pump, and significantly decreases the required heat energy.

Solar humidification–dehumidification 

The solar humidification–dehumidification (HDH) process (also called the multiple-effect humidification–dehumidification process, solar multistage condensation evaporation cycle (SMCEC) or multiple-effect humidification (MEH) mimics the natural water cycle on a shorter time frame by distilling water. Thermal energy produces water vapor that is condensed in a separate chamber. In sophisticated systems, waste heat is minimized by collecting the heat from the condensing water vapor and pre-heating the incoming water source.

Single-phase solar desalination

In indirect, or single phase, solar-powered desalination, two systems are combined: a solar energy collection system (e.g. photovoltaic panels) and a desalination system such as reverse osmosis (RO). The main single-phase processes, generally membrane processes, consist of RO and electrodialysis (ED). Single phase desalination is predominantly accomplished with photovoltaics that produce electricity to drive RO pumps. Over 15,000 desalination plants operate around the world. Nearly 70% use RO, yielding 44% of desalination. Alternative methods that use solar thermal collection to provide mechanical energy to drive RO are in development.

Reverse osmosis

RO is the most common desalination process due to its efficiency compared to thermal desalination systems, despite the need for water pre-treatment. Economic and reliability considerations are the main challenges to improving PV powered RO desalination systems. However, plummeting PV panel costs make solar-powered desalination more feasible.

Solar-powered RO desalination is common in demonstration plants due to the modularity and scalability of both PV and RO systems. An economic analysis that explored an optimisation strategy of PV-powered RO reported favorable results.

PV converts solar radiation into direct-current (DC) electricity, which powers the RO unit. The intermittent nature of sunlight and its variable intensity throughout the day complicates PV efficiency prediction and limits night-time desalination. Batteries can store solar energy for later use. Similarly, thermal energy storage systems ensure constant performance after sunset and on cloudy days.

Batteries allow continuous operation. Studies have indicated that intermittent operations can increase biofouling.

Batteries remain expensive and require ongoing maintenance. Also, storing and retrieving energy from the battery lowers efficiency.

Reported average cost of RO desalination is US$0.56/m3. Using renewable energy, that cost could increase up to US$16/m3. Although renewable energy costs are greater, their use is increasing.

Electrodialysis 
Both electrodialysis (ED) and reverse electrodialysis (RED) use selective ion transport through ion exchange membranes (IEMs) due either to the influence of concentration difference (RED) or electrical potential (ED).

In ED, an electrical force is applied to the electrodes; the cations travel toward the cathode and anions travel toward the anode. The exchange membranes only allow the passage of its permeable type (cation or anion), hence with this arrangement, diluted and concentrated salt solutions are placed in the space between the membranes (channels). The configuration of this stack can be either horizontal or vertical. The feed water passes in parallel through all the cells, providing a continuous flow of permeate and brine. Although this is a well-known process electrodialysis is not commercially suited for seawater desalination, because it can be used only for brackish water (TDS < 1000 ppm). Due to the complexity for modeling ion transport phenomena in the channels, performance could be affected, considering the non-ideal behavior presented by the exchange membranes.

The basic ED process could be modified and turned into RED, in which the polarity of the electrodes changes periodically, reversing the flow through the membranes. This limits the deposition of colloidal substances, which makes this a self-cleaning process, almost eliminating the need for chemical pre-treatment, making it economically attractive for brackish water.

The use ED systems began in 1954, while RED was developed in the 1970s. These processes are used in over 1100 plants worldwide. The main advantages of PV in desalination plants is due to its suitability for small-scale plants. One example is in Japan, on Oshima Island (Nagasaki), which has operated since 1986 with 390 PV panels producing 10 m3/day with dissolved solids (TDS) about 400 ppm.

See also 
 Point Paterson Desalination Plant

References

External links 
 

Water treatment
Water technology
Water conservation
Water desalination